Christian, Margrave of Brandenburg-Bayreuth (30 January 1581 in Cölln – 30 May 1655 in Bayreuth) was a member of the House of Hohenzollern and Margrave of Brandenburg-Kulmbach (later renamed Brandenburg-Bayreuth).

He was the eldest of eleven children born to John George, Elector of Brandenburg by his third wife Princess Elisabeth of Anhalt-Zerbst.

Life
The death of the childless George Frederick the Elder in 1603 marked the extinction of the original Franconian line of the Margraves of Brandenburg-Ansbach-Kulmbach. Christian inherited Kulmbach and his younger brother Joachim Ernst received Ansbach.

This land partition had already been legitimized in 1598 by the House Treaty of Gera, which was prepared for this purpose. Christian's assumption of the government of Kulmbach took place at the same time as that of Joachim Ernst in Ansbach. In 1604 Christian moved the seat of power from Kulmbach to Bayreuth and Plassenburg, however Kulmbach was retained as a regional fortress. From that moment, the principality changed its name from Brandenburg-Kulmbach to Brandenburg-Bayreuth.

In 1606 Christian was elected Colonel (German: Kreisobrist) of the Franconian Circle. He was also one of the founders of the Protestant Union and formed an alliance during the Thirty Years' War with Sweden. Emperor Ferdinand II tried to depose him as ruler of Bayreuth in 1635; however, he continued in office.

Family and children
In Plassenburg on 29 April 1604, Christian married Marie, daughter of Albert Frederick, Duke of Prussia. They had nine children:

 Elisabeth Eleonore (b. Plassenburg, 19 October 1606 – d. Plassenburg, 20 October 1606).
 Georg Frederick (b. and d. Kulmbach, 23 March 1608).
 Anna Maria (b. Bayreuth, 30 December 1609 – d. Ödenburg, 8 May 1680); married on 23 October 1639 to Prince Johann Anton I von Eggenberg.
 Agnes Sophie (b. Bayreuth, 19 July 1611 – d. Bayreuth, 1 December 1611).
 Magdalene Sibylle (b. Bayreuth, 27 October 1612 – d. Dresden, 20 March 1687); married on 13 November 1638 to Elector John George II of Saxony.
 Christian Ernst (b. Bayreuth, 18 November 1613 – d. Bayreuth, 4 February 1614).
 Erdmann August (b. Bayreuth, 8 October 1615 – d. Hof, 6 February 1651), Hereditary Margrave (German: Erbmarkgraf) of Brandenburg-Bayreuth.
 Georg Albrecht (b. Bayreuth, 20 March 1619 – d. Schretz, 27 September 1666), inherited Kulmbach but never reigned.
 Frederick Wilhelm (b. Bayreuth, 11 May 1620 – d. Bayreuth, 12 May 1620).

See also
Ordre de la Concorde

Ancestors 

Bayreuth, Christian, Margrave of
Bayreuth, Christian, Margrave of
Christian